Vincent Michael Gaughan is a Cook County Circuit Court Judge in Cook County, Illinois who presided in the historic trial of Jason Van Dyke, the Chicago Police officer who murdered Laquan McDonald.

Early years
Gaughan's parents were Irish immigrants who attended the St. Vincent de Paul Church, their local parish church. He was named "Vincent".  Their family home was in Lincoln Park.

Education

In 1964, he earned his Bachelor of Engineering (B.Eng.) at the University of Illinois. He earned his law degree at DePaul University College of Law and was admitted to the Illinois bar in September 1972.

Career
Gaughan joined the army after university and graduated from the Artillery Officer Candidate School in Fort Sill, Oklahoma where he was "commissioned as a second lieutenant. He was awarded the Bronze Star Medal for valor for his service in the Vietnam war (-1968).

He worked in the Cook County public defender's office from 1973 until 1991. He started out as a courtroom lawyer. Later he was a "felony trial lawyer supervisor". In 1991, he was appointed to the  Cook County, Illinois bench. He was elected as judge in 1992.

In May and June 2008, he presided over the jury trial of the American singer and record producer, R. Kelly, in which Kelly was acquitted on all counts of child pornography charges. The men found guilty in the Brown's Chicken massacre case in 2007 and 2009, were convicted in Gaughan's courtroom.

Judge Gaughan presided in the historic trial of Jason Van Dyke, the police officer who murdered the 17-year-old African American Laquan McDonald on October 20, 2014, in Chicago, Illinois. On June 6, 2016, Judge Gaughan agreed to name a special prosecutor for this case. On October 5, 2018, Van Dyke was found guilty of second degree murder. Judge Gaughan set the sentencing hearing date for January 18, 2019 and "lifted a decorum order, which will allow the Chicago Police Board to move ahead with disciplinary action against Van Dyke." The New York Times described it as the case that changed Chicago. A revealing February 10, 2015 article in Slate entitled "Sixteen Shots" by an independent Chicago-based journalist, placed the Chicago Police Department under public scrutiny. In 2015, a year after McDonald's murder, a Cook County judged ordered the City of Chicago to release police dashboard-camera video showing Van Dyke shooting the victim. On December 13, 2017, Judge Gaughan, "quashed a subpoena seeking the reporter Jamie Kalven's testimony, ending a battle over Mr. Kalven’s sources" saying that "the subpoena by the defense lacked specifics and sought 'irrelevant and privileged material'".

An article in the Chicago Tribune, described the case as "another high-profile trial" for Judge M. Gaughan, an "idiosyncratic judge who set the standard for how Cook County handles headline-making cases" in his "ornate courtroom" with a "distant view of Chicago's skyline. According to The New York Times, Judge Gaughan "is viewed as a mercurial jurist." Attorney Steven Greenberg said that "If you’re Jason Van Dyke, I don't think you can ask for a better judge to hear this case. Judge Gaughan is unique and he's certainly opinionated, but he will go out of his way to make sure everyone gets a fair hearing."

Personal life
When Vincent Gaughan returned from Vietnam, he lived with his parents in Lincoln Park. In April 1970, then 28-year-old Gaughan, a law student and war hero, who suffered from anxiety after the war, faced charges including aggravated assault.

Gaughan has been active in the Illinois branch of the American Legion since the 1990s when he served as its commander.

Notes

References

Living people
1940s births
DePaul University College of Law alumni
Grainger College of Engineering alumni
Judges of the Circuit Court of Cook County
United States Army personnel of the Vietnam War
Public defenders
Date of birth missing (living people)